The Cavling Prize is a prestigious Danish journalist award. It is awarded annually in January to "a journalist or a group of journalists who have shown initiative and talent in the past year." It is generally considered the most prestigious prize for Journalism in Denmark.

The Prize commemorates Henrik Cavling, founder of the Danish Journalists Confederation.

The prize consists of 20,000 kroner and a statuette made by George Rode depicting Henry Cavling. The prize is awarded by a committee appointed by the Danish Journalists' Federation executive committee.

Recipients
 1945 Henrik V. Ringsted
 1946 Ole Vinding
 1947 Gunnar R. Næsselund
 1948 Nele Topsøe (Nele Poul Sørensen)
 1949 Poul Dalgaard / Anders B. Nørgaard
 1950 Mogens Bostrup
 1951 Niels Blædel
 1952 Aage Hastrup
 1953 Per Arboe Rasmussen
 1954 Robert Kjældgård
 1955 not given
 1956 Røde Kors Ungarn-indsamlingen (eng: Red Cross Hungary-fund raiser)
 1957 Ole Hansen
 1958 not given
 1959 Dan Larsen
 1960 Viggo Duvå
 1961 Willy Reunert
 1962 Jørgen Hartmann-Petersen
 1963 Poul Trier Pedersen
 1964 Knud Poulsen
 1965 Poul Dalgaard
 1966 Herbert Pundik
 1967 Hans V. Bischoff
 1968 Erik Nørgaard
 1969 Thyra Christensen
 1970 Leif Blædel
 1971 Torgny Møller
 1972 Leif Kjeldsen
 1973 The chief editors of Vejle Avis
 1974 Anne Wolden-Ræthinge (Ninka)
 1975 Nele Rue
 1976 Harry Rasmussen
 1977 Jacob Andersen / Søren Jacobsen
 1978 Svend Bedsted / Jens Otto Kjær Hansen
 1979 Jørgen Flindt Pedersen / Erik Stephensen
 1980 Hanne Dam
 1981 Henning Thøgersen / Jan Michaelsen
 1982 J. B. Holmgård
 1983 Hanne Reintoft
 1984 Sten Bådsgård / Jørgen Pedersen
 1985 Allan Graubæk / Gunner Nielsen / Henrik Thomsen
 1986 Alex Frank Larsen
 1987 The magazine Press
 1988 Jens J. Espersen
 1989 Anders Peter Mathiasen / Jeppe Juhl
 1990 Erik Eisenberg / Ulrik Haagerup / Martin Uhlenfeldt
 1991 Leif O. Dahl / Claus G. Theilgaard
 1992 Nils Ufer (posthumous)
 1993 Mikkel Hertz
 1994 John Mynderup
 1995 Christian Nordkap / Lars Rugaard / Erik Valeur
 1996 Henrik Grunnet / Michael Klint 
 1997 Poul Brink
 1998 Tonni Vinkel Sørensen 
 1999 Søren Funch / Jens Chr. Hansen / Erik Eisenberg
 2000 Kim Dahl Nielsen / Kasper D. Borch 
 2001 Poul Høi 
 2002 Morten Pihl / Jakob Priess-Sørensen 
 2003 Charlotte Aagaard / Jørgen Steen Nielsen / Bo Elkjær 
 2004 Miki Mistrati / Thomas Stokholm / Jeppe Facius / Anders-Peter Mathiasen 
 2005  / Michael Klint
 2006 Miriam Dalsgaard / Olav Hergel 
 2007 Peter Øvig Knudsen 
 2008 Morten Crone / Morten Frich / Erik Refner / Jesper Woldenhof 
 2009 Jesper Tynell
 2010 Lars Nørgaard Pedersen / Asger Westh / Stine Larsen 
 2011 Ulrik Dahlin / Anton Geist 
 2012 Asbjørn With
 2013 Jeppe Gaardboe, Frederik Brun Madsen, Søren Kristensen, Michael Klint og Steen Jensen for Danmarks Radio 
 2014 Morten Pihl for Jyllands-Posten 
 2015 Puk Damsgård for Danmarks Radio
 2016	Chris Kjær Jessen, Michael Lund / Lars Nørgaard Pedersen for Berlingske
 2017	Camilla Stockmann and Janus Køster-Rasmussen for Politiken and DR
 2018	Eva Jung, Simon Bendtsen and Michael Lund for Berlingske
 2019	Tea Krogh Sørensen and Morten Pihl for Jyllands-Posten

References

Danish awards